This is a list of notable people from Patiala, a city in Punjab, India.

References

People from Patiala